Russula mustelina, commonly known as the russet brittlegill, is a basidiomycete mushroom of the genus Russula native to Europe and North America. Swedish mycologist Elias Magnus Fries described the species in his 1838 book Epicrisis Systematis Mycologici seu Synopsis Hymenomycetum.

Description 

The fruit bodies appear in autumn and can be partly submerged in the soil. The cap surface is dry and can be slightly sticky when wet. The colour is pale yellow to yellow-brown with wine-coloured cap margin and can be discoloured with wine-coloured splotches with age. The cream gills have an attachment to the stem ranging from adnate to adnexed. Fruit bodies have almost no odour. Its surface is dry and smooth.

Russula mustelina produces a yellowish spore print. The roundish spores have dimensions of 7.5–10.5 by 6.5–9 μm, with a reticulate (web-like) and ridged surface marked by occasional warts. 

Russula basifurcata is a similar species with smaller fruit bodies associated with oak trees at lower altitudes. The gills are forked near the stem.

Ecology 
Russula mustelina occurs in coniferous forests above  in the Sierra Nevada and Cascade Range in western North America. It is a component of rare peat bog habitat in the eastern Carpathians in Romania, where it is associated with European spruce (Picea abies). It also grows in the Ivory Coast where it is picked and eaten.

See also 
 List of Russula species

References

mustelina
Fungi described in 1838
Fungi of North America
Taxa named by Elias Magnus Fries
Fungi of Europe
Fungi of Africa